The Hydra World Tour was a concert tour by Dutch symphonic metal band Within Temptation in support of their sixth studio album, Hydra, released by Nuclear Blast on 31 January 2014. To date, it was their eight major tour and their third to see them playing worldwide. The tour passed over four continents and was divided into several legs according to the local of playing, presenting minor setlist variations from concerts of the same leg and a few more variations from leg to leg. A special leg was entitled "Theatres on Fire", in which saw the band playing seated shows at theatres in the Netherlands and Luxembourg.

The tour was commercially successful and the band managed to play in even bigger spaces, an improvement already seen on their previous world tour, as well presenting their first concert at the Wembley Arena and selling out theatre tickets for their theatre seated concerts in the Netherlands. The band also managed to play at several big festivals, like Download Festival, Bloodstock Open Air, and Wacken Open Air. A live album with footage from the Amsterdam concert was released later in 2014, under the name of Let Us Burn – Elements & Hydra Live in Concert.

Background
The tour was originally planned to start in January 2014, but then it was postponed to a month later, so the band could polish more the songs before releasing the album and also have more time to rehearsals for the following tour. After a period of radio and television appearances for acoustic performances and interviews, the band scheduled to embark officially on the tour. On 20 January, the band announced a try-out show for testing the songs live at the Effenaar, in Eindhoven (NL), to be held on 20 February, having the tickets sold out on the same day. The first official show happened on 26 February, in Helsinki, Finland, and the arena tour is going to pass primarily in Europe, abranging a few summer festivals. Due to great demand, several venues were changed to big ones in the purpose to comport more people. Due to the great reception of Hydra in the US, the band decided to tour again in North America, travelling from West to East coast and passing over twelve cities, being two in Canada and having some venues with sold out tickets, while on the last tour the band passed over only five cities. On 2 May, the band announced through their Facebook page that they were going to record the concert at the Heineken Music Hall, Amsterdam, in which happened on the same evening. The great part of the concert would late appear on the DVD Let Us Burn – Elements & Hydra Live in Concert together with some parts of the previous tour Elements 15th anniversary show. As the end of the European leg, the tour had an attendance of over 120.000 people. After the great reception of the previous albums on North America as well the North American leg of the Hydra World Tour, Nuclear Blast decided to release a together re-issue of both Enter and The Dance on 10 November 2014, to give the new listeners access to the band early material.

The band opted to focus on playing Hydra songs in its majority, being "Dog Days" the only one not played yet, and maintain their signature songs from previous releases, as Stand My Ground and Ice Queen, during great part of the presentations. As the album contains four invited vocalists, their part in the respective songs are played on tape as the videos are shown on the big screen, allowing these artists to appear somehow during the concerts, except for "Whole World is Watching" in which was played with guest vocalist Piotr Rogucki on Polish dates and was played only by den Adel in an acoustic version.

Theatre concerts
Right after the end of the arena concerts, the band announced via their website that on early 2015 they were going to embark on a new theatre tour  passing over Dutch cities and later one extra show in Luxembourg. The special leg of the tour came out differently from their previous theatre concerts in which the band used to present primarily acoustic renditions of their songs, with the Hydra seated leg featuring only a few acoustic versions and somewhat different renditions from them. The theatre leg ambientation was made sightly different from the common concerts to also present a visual spectacle in support of the music. The band made use of holographic projections to auxiliate the stage design and effect of some songs, such as a pre-recorded virtual orchestra playing on the stage and virtual holographic duets such as the one from den Adel and Anneke van Giersbergen during the presentation of "Somewhere".

Reception

The tour received generally positive reviews amongst critics.

In reviewing the bands presentation at the Wembley Arena, London, Ian Gittins from The Guardian classified the performance with 3 stars out of 5. Gittins commented the diversity the band delivered during the concert, praising the transition of "the portentous Our Solemn Hour" in which sampled "a Winston Churchill speech and veers off into cod Latin" to the "melodramatic romanticism of the sultry arthouse original and bellow it from a windswept mountaintop" that the band offered with a cover of Lana Del Rey's "Summertime Sadness" during the final encore. Gittins ended his review classifying the band as a "complete hokum and yet oddly enjoyable".

British website Bring the Noise also considered "Our Solemn Hour" and the final encore containing "Summertime Sadness" as the night main highlights, also praising den Adel's vocal ability and the stage additional effects as the use of pyrotechnics, giving the concert a 10/10 score.

However, Swedish newspaper Aftonbladet cited "Summertime Sadness" as the weakest point of the concert at the Sweden Rock Festival.

Robert van Gijssel, reviewing the first Amsterdam concert for Dutch newspaper Volkskrant also gave the presentation a three out of a possible five score. van Gijssel criticized the use of video recordings on the big screen during the songs that were originally duets, commenting that it "felt like you were standing up watching a music video" and classifying it as "showstoppers". On the other hand, van Gijssel praised the "extraordinarily in shape" voice of den Adel and cited "Our Solemn Hour", "Angels" and Dutch early 2000s hit "Ice Queen" as the highlight moments of the concert.

Flemish newspaper De Morgen also criticized the use of video recordings during the Antwerp concert, naming the show as the "Disneyland of virtual duets", but giving a score of 3.5 out of a possible 5 stars and praising den Adel's "angelic voice" as well the constant band interaction with the public. Also Flemish Gazet van Antwerpen praised the performance, commenting not only about the style variation of the band but also the public, in which contained "from blushing teen girls tattooed to thirty year old Metallica-shirt men".

Metal Hammer commented more positively about the use of virtual duets on the screen, saying that it may be a low point on the concert but den Adel manages to overcome it with her performance in songs like "Fire and Ice" and also "get the crowd jumping" during "Stand My Ground" and "Ice Queen".

French newspaper Le Parisien commented positively about their passage through Paris, stating that the group delivered "a very good performance with a few remarks about", praising den Adel's vocal performance particularly during "Angels" and "Jillian (I'd Give My Heart)". On 12 September 2014, the band received the award for Best Live Band at the Metal Hammer Awards.

Opening acts
 Amaranthe (North America)
 Delain (United Kingdom, Germany, France, Belgium and Netherlands dates)
 Serenity (Austria)

Setlist

Songs performed

Setlists

Tour dates

 A Rescheduled to 31 March due to political problems in Ukraine.
 B Canceled due to festival management issues.
 C Open air concert with Lacrimas Profundere.
 D Extra club concert.
 E Attendance and revenue based exclusively on the reported concerts.

Extra concerts

Personnel

Within Temptation
 Sharon den Adel – vocals
 Ruud Jolie – lead guitar
 Stefan Helleblad – rhythm guitar
 Martijn Spierenburg – keyboards
 Jeroen van Veen – bass guitar
 Mike Coolen – drums

Guest musicians
 
 Piotr Rogucki – featured vocals on "Whole World Is Watching" on 8 and 9 March 2014, 30 July 2015 and 24 June 2016
 Robert Westerholt – growls on "Silver Moonlight" on 2 and 3 May 2014, "The Dance" on 20 and 21 December 2015 and "Candles" on 20 and 21 December 2015 and 14 August 2016
 Henrik Englund – growls on "Silver Moonlight" on 5 October 2014
 Jonas Pap – cello on 9 August 2014, 8 August 2015 and "Theatres on Fire" leg
 Camila Van Der Kooij – violins on "Theatres on Fire" leg and at Black Christmas concerts
 Ivar de Graaf – featured vocals on "Gothic Christmas" at Black Christmas concerts
 Caroline Westendorp – growls on "Silver Moonlight" on 4 June 2016
 Tarja Turunen – vocals on "Paradise (What About Us?)" on 18 June and 14 August 2016

References

External links
 Within Temptation Official Website
 Within Temptation Tour Dates
 Within Temptation Tour Archive 

2014 concert tours
2015 concert tours
Within Temptation concert tours
Concert tours of Europe
Concert tours of Germany
Concert tours of the United Kingdom
Concert tours of the United States